Midnight Blue is a sexually-themed public access cable television program that aired on Manhattan Cable Television Channel J in New York City.

The show debuted in 1974, as Screw publisher Al Goldstein parlayed his publishing success into a cable access show, a freeform interview program that played on the late night airwaves of Manhattan cable for more than twenty-five years. He regularly included ads from phone sex companies, brothels, and escorts, the only television show to do so.

Midnight Blue was the subject of controversy when Goldstein testified before the United States Supreme Court in 1995 as part of a lawsuit brought against Time Warner Cable's plan to scramble sexually explicit public access programs unless subscribers gave written consent for them. The Supreme Court ultimately ruled in Goldstein's favor in 2000.

Al Goldstein was the host and producer along with radio personality Alex Bennett. Alex Bennett and Screw editor Bruce David were its creators and original producers.

Seven collections of show excerpts have been released on DVD by Nyaftermidnight and Blue Underground, Inc., together with added info about the actresses and scenes from their movies.

References

External links

American public access television shows
Pornographic television shows
1970s American television talk shows
1980s American television talk shows
1990s American television talk shows
2000s American television talk shows
1974 American television series debuts
2003 American television series endings